The Old Ozaukee County Courthouse in Port Washington, Wisconsin is a Richardsonian Romanesque-styled building built in 1901 and clad in gray-blue limestone from the nearby Cedarburg quarry. It was added to the National Register of Historic Places in 1976. The building currently serves as the county administration center.

History
In 1899, the Board of Ozaukee County, Wisconsin passed a resolution that bonds should be issued to build a new courthouse after it was decided that the previous one, which had been the site of an American Civil War draft riot in 1862, was no longer safe to use. Soon after, controversy erupted when many residents of the county petitioned for the location of the courthouse to be moved from Port Washington to Cedarburg, Wisconsin. Eventually, it was decided that the courthouse would remain in Port Washington and was to be built on the site of the previous one. The previous courthouse began being disassembled in late 1900 and court matters were temporarily handled at a nearby opera house. The new courthouse was opened in 1902. An annex was added to it in 1969.

In 1991, the county court relocated to a new Justice Center on the outskirts of Port Washington. The old courthouse and annex were remodeled and continue to house county government offices.

References

Courthouses on the National Register of Historic Places in Wisconsin
Buildings and structures in Ozaukee County, Wisconsin
Richardsonian Romanesque architecture in Wisconsin
Government buildings completed in 1902
National Register of Historic Places in Ozaukee County, Wisconsin